Biathlon at the 1968 Winter Olympics consisted of two biathlon events, held at Autrans. The events began on 9 February and ended on 11 February 1968. This was the first Olympics to feature more than one biathlon race, as the 4 x 7.5 kilometre relay made its debut.

Medal summary

Three nations won medals in biathlon, the Soviet Union leading the medal table with three, one of each type. Magnar Solberg and Alexander Tikhonov shared the lead in the individual medal table, each winning a gold and a silver.

Medal table

Events

Participating nations 

Sixteen nations sent biathletes to compete in Grenoble. Below is a list of the competing nations; in parentheses are the number of national competitors. Canada, East and West Germany and Czechoslovakia made their Olympic biathlon debut.

References

 
1968
1968 Winter Olympics events
1968 in biathlon
Biathlon competitions in France